The Federation of Canadian Naturists (FCN) is the official International Naturist Federation (INF) representative for English-speaking Canada. It was founded in 1986, and has been reported to have 1,000 members.

It publishes a quarterly magazine called Going Natural/Au naturel, which had a circulation of 1,000 in 2020.

Because the INF only recognizes one naturist organization per country, the FCN shares its membership with the Fédération Québécoise de Naturisme (FQN) (founded 1978).  Together, the FCN and FQN form the FQN-FCN Union for the purpose of joint membership in the INF.

See also
naturism
List of social nudity organizations

References

External links 
 

Clothing free organizations
Naturism in Canada
1985 establishments in Canada
Organizations established in 1985
Federations